Tadeusz Kaczorek (born April 27, 1932) from the Warsaw University of Technology, Warszawa, Poland was named Fellow of the Institute of Electrical and Electronics Engineers (IEEE) in 2013 for contributions to industrial control systems.

References

Fellow Members of the IEEE
Living people
1932 births
Place of birth missing (living people)
Academic staff of the Warsaw University of Technology